Kalavalapalli is a village in Chagallu mandal in West Godavari district in Andhra Pradesh state in India.
Brahmanagudem Railway Station and Chagallu Railway Station are the nearest railway stations.

Demographics

 census, village has population of 5984. Number of families was found to be 1685. Village has a sex ratio (male:female) of 1000:1019 with 2964 male and 3020 female population. This village is the least populated village in the Mandal. Growth rate of population is 7.53% from 2001 to 2011. Population of the village is expected to rise to 6,500 by 2021. 
The village has a literacy rate of 60.13%.

References

Villages in West Godavari district